Bel Aire is a historic home and farm located near Charlottesville, Albemarle County, Virginia.  It was built about 1825, and is a -story, four bay brick double-pile dwelling in the Federal style. It features an original flat-roof portico and side gable roof. It has a shed-roof addition dating to about 1860 or 1870, and a one-story sunroom addition, dated to about 1980.  Also on the property are a contributing chicken coop, corn crib, garage, and family cemetery.  The property is associated with the prominent Virginia Michie family and documented as James H. Michie, owner.

It was added to the National Register of Historic Places in 2007.

References

Houses on the National Register of Historic Places in Virginia
Federal architecture in Virginia
Houses completed in 1825
Houses in Albemarle County, Virginia
National Register of Historic Places in Albemarle County, Virginia